The Workers' House  ( xâne-ye kârgar) is the Iranian de facto national trade union center affiliated with the World Federation of Trade Unions (WFTU) and a registered reformist worker's political organization/labour union. It oversees and coordinates activities of Islamic Labour Councils.

Formed in 1958 by union of some workers' guilds, the union has been historically a worker wing affiliated with various parties. In 1981, it was dominated by Islamist workers.

In 1998, Worker’s House stated that ⅓ of Iranian workers were its members, however 
there is no independent verification for this claim.

International Labour Organization (ILO) recognizes the dependence of the union on the government. After confrontation with the Government of Mahmoud Ahmadinejad, the union has been losing its state-supported status.

The union also operates the Iranian Labour News Agency (ILNA) since 2002 with an aim to 'inform dissemination for the toiling stratum of labourers, and with justice-centered discourse as its motto'. Work and Worker daily is also published by Ali Rabiei, a key member.

References

1958 establishments in Iran
Trade unions in Iran
World Federation of Trade Unions
Reformist political groups in Iran
Labour parties
Left-wing parties
Trade unions established in 1958
Political parties established in 1992
Electoral lists for Iranian legislative election, 2012
Worker wings of political parties
Political parties of the Iranian Revolution
Iran